Mordovka was a historical Russian currency that circulated in Volga Region in 15-18th centuries. It was found in hoards in Volga Region and Middle Asia.

Etymology 
The term mordovka ( lit.'Mordvin woman') is in use since 19th century among Russian numismatists for all similar coins or tokens found in Volga region.

History 
Russian ethnographer  had been collecting this kind coins for more than 30 years and divided his corpus in two classes he called Type A and type B. Type B coins or tokens were made of different alloys and used mostly in Moksha women traditional costumes as decoration. Zaikovsky notes that even he himself knows one of the places where this kind of craft was produced (Traka village). He points at the fact that Tatar, Kyrgyz or Russian women never use them as decoration. Moreover a legend exists they were money in old times. He never received a positive reaction from Russian numismatists as they all believed these coins are just decoration tokens or "Post-Peter kopecks imitations". They hadn't share Zaikovsky's enthusiasm regarding his findings since they just did not believe the mere idea that  Mordvins considered illiterate village folk could ever have their own money. He lists hidden treasure cites with buckets of mordovkas found and attract numismatists communinity's attention to the problem of the existing early monetary systems in Volga region and coins authenticity.

Type A coins

Type A are minted of silver and look like authentic coins. They have readable inscriptions. Saratov State University scholar Iosif Cherapkin, expert in Moksha language, had examined type A coins and confirmed their authenticity. Inscription resembled Cyrillc without soft signs and was readable in Old (Middle) Moksha and says 'It circulates as 1/2 of gold'.

Cherapkin's Inscription

Cherapkin's inscription on the coins as had been attested is written in Old or precisely Middle Moksha  in Greek uncial script with digamma 'ͷ' or an unknown variant of Cyrillic without soft signs. Three of the four word forms are older that those attested in Nicolaes Witsen's Dutch-Moksha dictionary issued in 1692 The word  is attested in Old Khanty language пелки (pelki) 'half' in a given name which is nowadays considered archaic and the word consequently is obsolete. The contemporary Khanty term is "пелəк (pelək)" half. Another  inscription on a mordovka was in Old Erzya in the same script with the similar meaning.

Triangle Moksha coins
Zavariukhin describes as well 22x23 mm size triangle form silver coins with obverse featured a woman's bust. Those coins first were described by Vladimir Aunovsky in 1869, he reports they are used in traditional Moksha woman's headdress decoration and they say that was their queen depiction, meaning princess Narchat.

Bracteates
Evgeny Arsiukhin describes his collection from Chuvashia and divides his corpus into complex 1 and complex 2. Complex 1 is a 2001 hidden treasure assemblage found in Chuvashia includes mordovkas and Ruthenian coins. Complex 2 is a collection of coins from old Chuvashian  used before as a decoration. Complex 1 with Ф-tamga include a bracteate with "Cyrillic inscription in 18th century manner". Spassky previously pointed out at huge amount of false coins in Muscovy mint but this type bracteate seems to be formed much earlier, between  1547 and 1565.

See also 
 Mokshas
 Narchat
 Moksha language
 Mukhsha Coinage
 Murunza Kingdom
 History of Middle Volga
 Ruthenia

Sources

Zverev S.V. Printsipy formirovania tipov podrazhatelnykh monet Kazanskogo khanstva. Ob izobrazheniyakh na mordovkakh. Sovetsky kollektsioner. Moscow, 1991. No 28
Nesterov I. V. Mordovki - padcheritsy russkoy monetnoy sistemy. Faizkhanovskiye chtenia. Materials of 5th annual scientific and practical conference. Moscow, Nizhny Novgorod, 2009
Mashkov V.V. Monety vostochno-slavianskogo prigranichya. Yekaterinburg, SV-96, 1998, pp. 234-235

References

Denominations (currency)
Ancient Russia
Coins of Russia
Ruthenia
Old East Slavic inscriptions
Golden Horde
Silver coins
Obsolete units of measurement
Medieval currencies
Volga Finns